Colotois is a genus of moths in the family Geometridae.

Selected species
 Colotois pennaria – feathered thorn (Linnaeus, 1761)

References
 Colotois at Markku Savela's Lepidoptera and Some Other Life Forms
 Natural History Museum Lepidoptera genus database

Colotoini
Geometridae genera
Taxa named by Jacob Hübner